Demos is the first full-length album by Alkaline Trio singer/guitarist Matt Skiba. It is composed of demos that Skiba has recorded into his computer. Skiba released the project on Asian Man Records, which was Alkaline Trio's label for their first two full-length albums, Goddamnit and Maybe I'll Catch Fire. Four of the songs from this release, namely "Angel of Deaf," "Haven't You," "How The Hell Did We Get Here," and "Nausea (Cruel and Unusual),"  were later rerecorded and released on Babylon, Skiba's first album with his band The Sekrets. On that release, however, "Nausea (Cruel and Unusual)" underwent lyrical alterations and was renamed "Olivia."

Track listing
All songs written and performed by Matt Skiba.

References

2010 debut albums
Demo albums
Matt Skiba albums